Agnes C. Hall (née Scott) (1777–1846) was a Scottish writer of novels and non-fiction articles, and also a translator. She used the pseudonym Rosalia St Clair.

Life
Born in Roxburghshire, she was the wife of Dr. Robert Hall who died in 1824. She survived him, dying in London on 1 December 1846. Her time in the literary world brought her in particular the acquaintance of John Stuart Mill; but her financial difficulties were serious, and she applied in particular to the Royal Literary Fund.

Works
Hall was a contributor on literary and scientific topics to Olinthus Gregory's Pantologia, William Nicholson's British Encyclopedia, and Rees's Cyclopædia; also to John Aikin's Old Monthly, and Knight's Printing Machine. She wrote the notes to Anton Zacharias Helms's Buenos Ayres (1806). During her later years she contributed to the Annual Biography, the Westminster Review, and Fraser's Magazine.

In fiction, she published Rural Recreations; Obstinacy (1826), a tale for young people; First and Last Years of Wedded Life, a story of Irish life in the reign of George IV; and a historical novel based on the massacre of Glencoe.

Hall translated the Travels of F. R. J. De Pons (1807), Jean Baptiste Bory de Saint-Vincent, Michel Ange Bernard de Mangourit (Travels in Hanover), Aubin-Louis Millin de Grandmaison and François Pouqueville (1813), Goldberry and Michaux. Other translations included Vittorio Alfieri's Autobiography (1810), Madame de Genlis's historical romance La Duchesse de La Vallière (1804), and some other works by the same writer, and some of the tales of August Heinrich Lafontaine.

Notes

External links
Corvey Novels Project, Rosalia St. Clair.

Attribution

1777 births
1846 deaths
19th-century Scottish writers
Scottish translators
19th-century British women writers
19th-century British writers
19th-century British translators